Carole Jacques (born 12 June 1960) was a Progressive Conservative member of the House of Commons of Canada. She was a lawyer by career.

She represented the Quebec riding of Montreal—Mercier where she was first elected in the 1984 federal election. At the time of her election, she was the youngest woman ever elected to the House of Commons. She was re-elected in 1988 when she ran in the Mercier riding following electoral district boundary changes in 1987. She served in the 33rd and 34th Canadian Parliaments.

Jacques left the Progressive Conservative party and became an independent candidate for the Mercier riding in the 1993 federal election. However, she lost to Francine Lalonde of the Bloc Québécois.

References

External links
 

1960 births
Living people
Members of the House of Commons of Canada from Quebec
Progressive Conservative Party of Canada MPs
Women members of the House of Commons of Canada
Women in Quebec politics